The Karlsruhe Open is a WTA 125-level professional women's tennis tournament. It takes place on outdoor clay courts, around the months of July and August at the Tennis Club Rüppurr in the city of Karlsruhe in Germany. The prize money is $115,000.

Results

Singles

Doubles

References

External links
 Official website

Tennis tournaments in Germany
clay court tennis tournaments
WTA 125 tournaments
Annual events in Germany
2019 establishments in Germany
Recurring sporting events established in 2019